Otávio Edmilson da Silva Monteiro (born 9 February 1995), commonly known as Otávio or Otavinho, is a Portuguese professional footballer who plays as an attacking midfielder or a winger for Primeira Liga club Porto and the Portugal national team.

He came through Internacional's, before signing with Portuguese Primeira Liga side Porto in 2014 as a free agent. He was immediately sent two-year loan deal to Vitória de Guimarães, before returning in 2016. After returning he became a starter, and won three Primeira Liga titles, two Taça de Portugal and two Supertaças Cândido de Oliveira, while being part of the squad that won two domestic doubles in 2020 and 2022, making over 200 official appearances for them.

Born and raised in Brazil, Otávio represented his native country internationally at the under-20 level in 2014, but switched allegiance at the senior international level to Portugal, making his senior international debut in 2021.

Club career

Internacional
Born in João Pessoa, Paraíba, Otávio finished his development at Internacional after joining the Porto Alegre club's academy at the age of 15. He made his Série A debut only two years later, coming on as a second-half substitute in the 0–0 home draw against Santos on 15 July.

Otávio's first league goal arrived on 8 June 2013, when he started and helped to a 2–2 away draw to Cruzeiro. He added a further five during the season, in a 13th-place finish.

Otávio credited manager Dunga for helping him overcome his weight problems. During his spell at the Estádio Beira-Rio, he netted seven times in 62 competitive matches.

Porto
On 1 September 2014, even though it was originally thought the transfer had cost €5 million, Otávio joined FC Porto as a free agent after Internacional ceded his federative rights, and signed a five-year contract with a €50 million buyout clause. He was initially assigned to the reserve team, who competed in the Segunda Liga.

In the last day of the 2015 January transfer window, Otávio, Ivo Rodrigues and Leocísio Sami were loaned to Vitória de Guimarães in the Primeira Liga. He made his debut in the competition on 8 February by playing 30 minutes in a 0–1 home loss against Belenenses, and scored his first goal in the last matchday of the campaign to help the visitors beat Académica de Coimbra 4–2.

The deal was extended for the entire 2015–16, and his performances while on loan earned him a contract extension with Porto subsequently. He made his competitive debut for the latter on 12 August 2016, starting in the 3–1 away defeat of Rio Ave.

Otávio won the Portuguese League at the end of his second season, contributing two goals from 15 appearances. He was sidelined for several weeks during the tournament, due to injury problems.

During the 2019–20 campaign, Otávio featured in 48 games and scored two goals, helping the team conquer the double. As a result, he was included in the league's Best XI.

International career

Brazil
Shortly after making his Internacional debut, Otávio was selected to the Brazil under-20 side by Alexandre Gallo.

Portugal
Otávio became a Portuguese citizen in March 2021. On 26 August of that year, he was called up to the Portugal national team by Fernando Santos for 2022 FIFA World Cup qualifiers against the Republic of Ireland and Azerbaijan and a friendly with Qatar. He made his debut against the latter, scoring in the 3–1 win at the Nagyerdei Stadion in Debrecen, Hungary.

On 24 March 2022, Otávio scored his second goal, opening an eventual 3–1 home victory over Turkey in the semi-finals of the World Cup qualification play-offs and later providing an assist for Diogo Jota.

In October, he was named in Portugal's preliminary 55-man squad for the 2022 FIFA World Cup in Qatar, being included in the final 26-man squad for the tournament.

Career statistics

Club

International

Portugal score listed first, score column indicates score after each Otávio goal.

Honours
Internacional
Campeonato Gaúcho: 2013, 2014

Porto
Primeira Liga: 2017–18, 2019–20, 2021–22
Taça de Portugal: 2019–20, 2021–22
Taça da Liga: 2022–23
Supertaça Cândido de Oliveira: 2018, 2020

Individual
SJPF Player of the Month: July 2020
Primeira Liga Team of the Year: 2019–20, 2021–22

References

External links

Profile at the FC Porto website

1995 births
Living people
People from João Pessoa, Paraíba
Portuguese people of Brazilian descent
Brazilian emigrants to Portugal
Naturalised citizens of Portugal
Brazilian footballers
Portuguese footballers
Association football midfielders
Campeonato Brasileiro Série A players
Sport Club Internacional players
Primeira Liga players
Liga Portugal 2 players
FC Porto B players
FC Porto players
Vitória S.C. players
Vitória S.C. B players
Brazil youth international footballers
Portugal international footballers
Brazilian expatriate footballers
Expatriate footballers in Portugal
Brazilian expatriate sportspeople in Portugal
Sportspeople from Paraíba
2022 FIFA World Cup players